Asaphodes camelias is a species of moth in the family Geometridae. It is endemic to New Zealand and inhabits native forest. The adults of this species are on the wing from February to May and July to September.

Taxonomy
This species was first described by Edward Meyrick in 1888 as Larentia camelias using a male specimen collected at the Whangārei Heads in December. George Hudson discussed this species in his 1898 book under the name Xanthorhoe camelias and again, as well as illustrating the species, in his 1928 publication. In 1971 J. S. Dugdale placed this species in the genus Asaphodes. This placement was affirmed by Dugdale in 1988. The male holotype specimen is held at the Natural History Museum, London.

Description 

Meyrick described this species as follows:

Distribution
This species is endemic to New Zealand. Specimens of this species have been collected in the southern North Island hill country, as well as near the Waitaha River and at Paroa, both in the South Island. A. camelias is regarded a typical species of the West Coast region.

Behaviour 
The adults of this species are on the wing from February to May and July to September.

Habitat 
This species inhabits native forest.

References

External links

 Specimens held at the Auckland Museum.

Moths described in 1888
Moths of New Zealand
Larentiinae
Endemic fauna of New Zealand
Taxa named by Edward Meyrick
Endemic moths of New Zealand